Amir Ayyub (also Romanized as Amīr Ayyūb and Amīr ‘Ayūb) is a village in Poshtkuh-e Rostam Rural District, Sorna District, Rostam County, Fars Province, Iran. At the 2006 census, its population was 246, in 58 families.

References 

Populated places in Rostam County